Bradford Friends Meetinghouse, also known as Marshallton Meeting House, is a historic Quaker meeting house located at Marshallton in West Bradford Township, Chester County, Pennsylvania.  It was built in 1764–1765, and is a one-story, stone structure with a gable roof.  A porch was added to two sides of the building in the 19th century. The interior is divided into four rooms, rather than the customary two. Abraham Marshall, father of botanist Humphry Marshall was instrumental in the establishment of the meeting in the 1720s.  The meeting originally met from 1722 to 1727 at the Marshall home, Derbydown Homestead, from 1722 to 1727.

It was added to the National Register of Historic Places in 1971.  It is located in the Marshallton Historic District.

References

External links
 Bradford Friends Meeting House, Northbrook Road, West Bradford Township, Marshallton, Chester County, PA: 41 photos, 4 color transparencies, 9 measured drawings, 29 data pages, and 4 photo caption pages at Historic American Buildings Survey

Quaker meeting houses in Pennsylvania
Churches on the National Register of Historic Places in Pennsylvania
Churches completed in 1765
Churches in Chester County, Pennsylvania
18th-century Quaker meeting houses
Historic district contributing properties in Pennsylvania
National Register of Historic Places in Chester County, Pennsylvania